TV-3 (also known as TV-3 Russia) is a Russian television channel focused on entertainment. It mainly broadcasts TV series in mystery, science fiction and fantasy genres. It was purchased in 2006 by Vladimir Potanin's ProfMedia (ПрофМедиа), which in turn was purchased by the Russian natural gas giant Gazprom and placed in its Gazprom Media division in December 2013.

TV-3 has been accused of propaganda of superstition and esoterism, including showing of films made of statements of scientists taken out of context that made it look like the scientists were talking to the TV-3 presenter. In 2015, it was nominated for "the most harmful pseudoscientific project (for spreading of myths, delusions and superstitions)" antiprize of a state prize of the Ministry of Education and Science; the prize was, however, awarded to REN TV's conspirological documentaries.

March 2015 - the channel becomes part of the sub-holding "Gazprom-Media Entertainment Television" (GPM RTV), its office began to be located in the building of the business center "Diamond Hall", together with the headquarters of the TV channels "TNT", "2x2" and "Friday !”.

On 26 January 2016, TV-3 hosted the Russian premiere of the tenth, and on 4 January 2018, the eleventh season of the cult American television series The X-Files.

Programmings

Notes

Russian-language television stations in Russia
Television channels and stations established in 1956
1956 establishments in Russia
Television channels and stations established in 1994
1994 establishments in Russia
Television channel articles with incorrect naming style